A bol is a standardized mnemonic syllable used in North Indian classical music to define the tala, or rhythmic pattern. Bol is derived from the Hindi word bolna (बोलना), which means "speak." One who learns to play the tabla or pakhavaj (or pakhawaj) drum is taught to recite the rhythms as bols, which can be quite complex.

Bol is analogous to konnakol, which is used to recite rhythms for the mridangam drum in Carnatic music, which is South Indian classical music.

See also

 Konakkol
 Kuchi shōga
 Counting (music)

References

External links
KKSongs Talamala - Tabla Bol Reference has recordings of tabla bols.
Instruments in Depth: Tabla: Drums of North India, an online feature from Bloomingdale School of Music (March, 2008)
Chandra & David's Tablasite contains detailed instructions on producing each bol.

Tala (music)